Mount Noel is a Miocene volcanic complex in the Chilcotin Group in British Columbia, Canada, located  southwest of Bralorne and north of a tributary of Noel Creek. Mount Noel is thought to have formed as a result of back-arc extension behind the Cascadia subduction zone.

See also
 List of volcanoes in Canada
 Volcanism of Canada
 Volcanism of Western Canada

References

Volcanoes of British Columbia
Two-thousanders of British Columbia
Pacific Ranges
Complex volcanoes
Rift volcanoes
Bridge River Country
Miocene volcanoes
Polygenetic volcanoes
Lillooet Land District